Helge Vilhelm Andersson (20 February 1907 – 6 September 1960) was a Swedish footballer who played for Västerås and Surahammars IF. He featured twice for the Sweden national football team in 1928 and 1932, scoring two goals.

Career statistics

International

International goals
Scores and results list Sweden's goal tally first.

References

1907 births
1960 deaths
Sportspeople from Västerås
Swedish footballers
Sweden international footballers
Association football forwards
IFK Västerås players